Osojnik is a village in the Dubrovnik-Neretva County, Croatia. The settlement is administered as a part of the city of Dubrovnik.
According to national census of 2001, population of the settlement is 321.

Sources

Populated places in Dubrovnik-Neretva County